A. Zahur Miah is a Bangladesh Awami League politician and the former Member of Parliament of Sunamganj-4.

Early life and education
A. Zahur was born on 10 November 1925 in the village of Binnakuli in Tahirpur upazila of Sunamganj district in the Bengal Presidency of British India (now Bangladesh). His father was late Thakur Dhan Talukder and his mother's name was Amena Begum. He was the third of seven siblings. Zahur was admitted in the second class of Rajargaon Primary School in 1936. In 1938, he was admitted in the third class of Gourarang Middle English School. After studying there for four years, he passed the first section of the secondary scholarship examination. He was later admitted in the seventh class of Sunamganj Jubilee High School and after matriculation from there he obtained BA degree from Sylhet MC College in 1952.He then enrolled in the law department of Dhaka University for higher studies.

Career
A. Zahur played an active role in the anti-British movement. In 1948 he was elected president of the Sunamganj subdivision Muslim Students Federation. He later joined the Democratic Party. He was involved in the language movement in 1952. He played an active role in the 1954 United Front elections. He joined the Awami League in 1989. He joined Satgaon High School as a teacher from 1959 to 1971 and served as the headmaster. In the 1970 election (Sunamganj North and Tahirpur) he was elected a member of the provincial council. He took active part in the war of liberation in 1971.
Miah was elected to parliament from Sunamganj-4 as a Bangladesh Awami League candidate in 1991.

Personal life
He married in 1959 to Begum Rahima Zahur, daughter of Mohammad Hussain Talukder of Baradal village in Tahirpur, Sunamganj. Fatema Chowdhury Swapna, the eldest of their six sons and daughters, is currently living in America, then Nazma Begum, she is also currently living in America, the third is Advocate Rita Begum. Son Junaid Ahmed, now in business Sunamganj, Sultana Razia Nita and Pabel Ahmed are currently expatriates in America.
He died on 22 May 2006.

References

Awami League politicians
Living people
5th Jatiya Sangsad members
Year of birth missing (living people)